Beth Jacob Congregation is a Conservative Jewish synagogue located in Mendota Heights, Minnesota, United States. It was founded in 1985 and has a membership of 400 families. Beth Jacob is a community of Jews who come together to nurture relationships with God and each other. It is a Conservative synagogue that values Torah (study), Avodah (reverential service) and Gemilut Hasadim (acts of loving kindness). Men, women and children have equal opportunity to be part of the community.

Activities
Regular services take place on weekday mornings, on the Shabbat, including dedicated children's services, and on the Jewish holidays.

The community has received nine national programming awards from the United Synagogue of Conservative Judaism for its social activities (Chesed, acts of thoughtfulness). It was one of only four synagogues selected to participate in a nationwide study of the Conservative movement in the United States. It was selected to participate because of its sustained growth, creative programming, and cohesive community. The results of this research were published in the book "Jews in the Center: Conservative Synagogues and their Members".

The innovative certification process Magen Tzedek ("Justice Certification") was pioneered by Rabbi Morris Allen in response to a scandal involving kosher meat producer Agriprocessors in 2006.

See also
Conservative Judaism

References

External links
 Official website
 

Conservative synagogues in Minnesota